Jeff Lewis is a singer-songwriter from Dallas, Texas. He was a contestant on The Voice Season 4, on Team Usher.

Notable work 

Lewis is featured on the Lego Batman soundtrack on the track "Friends Are Family" by Oh, Hush! feat. Will Arnett and Jeff Lewis. The soundtrack debuted at number 18 and peaked at number 11 on the Billboard Soundtrack charts in 2017.

Lewis is also featured on the Lego Ninjago Movie soundtrack with Oh, Hush!, in the song "Found My Place."

Lewis is also featured on the Descendants soundtrack, providing King Ben's singing voice. The song "Did I Mention" from the film is performed by Lewis and Mitchell Hope, and peaked at number 2 on the Billboard Bubbling Under Hot 100 Singles chart. "Set It Off", performed by Lewis, Dove Cameron, Sofia Carson, Sarah Jeffery, Cameron Boyce, Booboo Stewart, and Mitchell Hope, debuted at number 17 and peaked at number 6 on the Billboard Bubbling Under Hot 100 Singles chart. Lewis returned for the Descendants 2 soundtrack, in the song "You and Me."

References

People from Dallas
The Voice (franchise) contestants
Living people
Year of birth missing (living people)